Néstor Raúl Gorosito (born 14 May 1964) is an Argentine football manager and former player who played as a midfielder. He is the current manager of Colón.

Playing career 
Néstor Pipo Gorosito began his playing career at River Plate, and subsequently had 3 spells at San Lorenzo where he scored 72 goals in 241 appearances. His other main club was Chile's Universidad Católica, where he contributed with 149 appearances and retired with the side in 2000.

Gorosito had a spell playing for Swarovski Tirol in Austria between 1989 and 1991, and in Japan with Yokohama Marinos in 1996. He also made 19 appearances for Argentina national team between 1989 and 1997.

Managerial history 
Gorosito started his managerial career at Nueva Chicago in 2003, avoiding relegation with the side in the play-offs. He was subsequently appointed at San Lorenzo de Almagro, but was sacked in 2004 after a poor run of results.

In 2005 Gorosito was named Lanús manager, but his reign only lasted two months. He was appointed at the helm of Rosario Central in the following year, being relieved from his duties in March 2007.

In 2008 Gorosito guided Argentinos Juniors to a qualification for that year's Copa Sudamericana, the club's first international tournament since 1996 Supercopa Sudamericana. Appointed by River Plate on 8 December 2008, he resigned on 4 October 2009 after underachieving in both Copa Libertadores and Primera División.

On 19 January 2010, Gorosito was named Xerez CD manager, with the side being dead last in La Liga. Despite suffering relegation, he achieved seven wins out of 19 matches, but left the club in July after failing to agree a new deal.

In September 2011 Gorosito returned to Argentinos Juniors, but resigned on 28 February of the following year, after suffering intestinal damage and a fractured vertebra in a car crash hours before his team lost against San Lorenzo. On 23 October 2012 he was appointed manager of Tigre.

Gorosito took Tigre to the final of 2012 Copa Sudamericana, but stepped down from his role on 6 July 2013 after having altercations with the club's board. In October 2014 he returned to Argentinos, taking the club back to the first division at first attempt.

On 23 December 2015 Gorosito was appointed manager of UD Almería, ranked last in Segunda División. On 16 May of the following year, he was sacked after his side was still in the relegation zone.

Personal life
Gorosito has also worked in TV, as a consultant manager during 2005, on Fox Sports Latin America.

Career statistics

Club

National team

Managerial statistics

Honours

Player
River Plate
Primera División Argentina: 1985–86
Copa Libertadores: 1986
Intercontinental Cup: 1986
Swarovski Tirol
Austrian Bundesliga: 1989–90, 1990–91

Universidad Católica
Copa Interamericana: 1994
Copa Chile: 1995

Argentina
Copa América: 1993
Artemio Franchi Cup: 1993

Manager

Tigre
Copa de la Superliga: 2019

Olimpia
Paraguayan Primera División: 2020

Individual
Argentine Primera División Top scorer: 1988–89

References

External links

 
 
 
 

1964 births
Living people
People from San Fernando de la Buena Vista
Argentine footballers
Association football midfielders
Argentine Primera División players
Club Atlético River Plate footballers
San Lorenzo de Almagro footballers
Austrian Football Bundesliga players
J1 League players
Yokohama F. Marinos players
Club Deportivo Universidad Católica footballers
1989 Copa América players
1993 Copa América players
Copa América-winning players
Argentina international footballers
Argentine expatriate footballers
Argentine expatriate sportspeople in Austria
Argentine expatriate sportspeople in Japan
Argentine expatriate sportspeople in Chile
Expatriate footballers in Austria
Expatriate footballers in Japan
Expatriate footballers in Chile
Argentine football managers
Club Atlético Lanús managers
Nueva Chicago managers
San Lorenzo de Almagro managers
Rosario Central managers
Argentinos Juniors managers
Club Atlético River Plate managers
Club Atlético Tigre managers
La Liga managers
Segunda División managers
Xerez CD managers
UD Almería managers
Club Olimpia managers
Club de Gimnasia y Esgrima La Plata managers
Club Atlético Colón managers
Argentine expatriate sportspeople in Spain
Expatriate football managers in Spain
Sportspeople from Buenos Aires Province
FC Swarovski Tirol players